Clayton Ridge Community School District is a rural public school district in Clayton County, Iowa, serving Guttenberg, Garnavillo, Clayton, North Buena Vista, and Osterdock. In addition, Clayton Center is zoned to Clayton Ridge schools, as well as areas around Garber.  The school mascot is the Eagles, and the colors are green, black and silver.

History
It was established on July 1, 2005, by the merger of the Guttenberg Community School District and the Garnavillo Community School District. The merger was approved in a September 14, 2004 election, with Guttenberg district voters approving it 396–19, and Garnavillo district voters approving it 188–20. The two pre-merger districts began sharing athletic teams in 2000 and whole-grade-sharing (in which students from one district attend another district's schools for a particular grade level) in 2001.

Allan Nelson began serving of the superintendent of the district upon its legal creation in 2005; he was the joint superintendent of the two pre-merger districts beginning on July 1, 2002, when they were still grade-sharing. Nelson retired on June 30, 2015.

Schools
 Clayton Ridge High School (Guttenberg)
 Clayton Ridge Middle School (Guttenberg)
 Clayton Ridge Elementary School (Garnavillo)
 Clayton Ridge Preschool (Garnavillo)

Previously elementary school grades were in Guttenberg and middle school grades were in Garnavillo, but in 2016 the district began changing the configurations. Grades 4 and 8 were moved to Garnavillo and Guttenberg, respectively, that year. In 2018 the remaining middle school grades went to Guttenberg while the remaining elementary school grades went to Garnavillo.

Clayton Ridge High School

Athletics
The Eagles compete in the Upper Iowa Conference in the following sports:

Cross Country
Volleyball
Football
Basketball
Track and Field 
Golf 
Baseball 
Softball

See also
List of school districts in Iowa
List of high schools in Iowa

References

External links
 Clayton Ridge Community School District

School districts in Iowa
Education in Clayton County, Iowa
2005 establishments in Iowa
School districts established in 2005